Displacement may refer to:

Physical sciences

Mathematics and Physics
Displacement (geometry), is the difference between the final and initial position of a point trajectory (for instance, the center of mass of a moving object). The actual path covered to reach the final position is irrelevant.
Particle displacement, a measurement of distance of the movement of a particle in a medium as it transmits a wave (represented in mathematics by the lower-case Greek letter ξ)
Displacement field (mechanics), an assignment of displacement vectors for all points in a body that is displaced from one state to another
Electric displacement field, as appears in Maxwell's equations
Wien's displacement law, a relation concerning the spectral distribution of blackbody radiation
Angular displacement, a change in orientation of a rigid body, the amount of rotation about a fixed axis.

Engineering
Engine displacement, the total volume of air/fuel mixture an engine can draw in during one complete engine cycle
Displacement (fluid), an object immersed in a fluid pushes the fluid out of the way 
Positive displacement meter, a pump or flow meter which processes a definite fluid volume per revolution
Displacement has several meanings related to ships and boats
Displacement hull, where the moving hull's weight is supported by buoyancy alone and it must displace water from its path rather than planing on the water's surface
Displacement speed, a rule of thumb for non planing watercraft to estimate their theoretical maximum speed
Displacement (ship), several related measurements of a ship's weight
Insulation displacement connector, a type of electrical connector
Displacement mapping, a technique in 3D computer graphics

Chemistry
Single displacement reaction, a chemical reaction concerning the exchange of ions
Double displacement reaction, a chemical reaction concerning the exchange of ions
Radioactive displacement law of Fajans and Soddy, elements/isotopes created during radioactive decay

Geology
Earth Crustal Displacement, an aspect of the Pole shift hypothesis

Medicine
Displacement (orthopedic surgery), change in alignment of the fracture fragments

Social sciences
Displacement (linguistics), the ability of humans (and possibly some animals) to communicate ideas that are remote in time and/or space
Forced displacement, by persecution or violence
Displacement (psychology), a sub-conscious defense mechanism
Displacement (parapsychology), a statistical or qualitative correspondence between targets and responses.
Development-induced displacement, the displacement of population for economic development
Displacement may occur during gentrification.

Sport
Displacement (fencing), a movement that avoids or dodges an attack

Other
 Child displacement

See also
Offset (disambiguation)
Transformation (geometry)